The 1999 Rugby League Tri-Nations series was contested by Australia, Great Britain and New Zealand in 1999. It was the first multi-national rugby league tournament to feature the sport's three world powers since the 1989–92 World Cup (the 1995 World Cup featured England and Wales separately). Co-hosts Australia and New Zealand played in the final, which was narrowly won by the Kangaroos. Great Britain didn't win a game of the tournament.

After the Lions narrowly defeated the Queensland Cup premiers, Burleigh Bears, a poor crowd attended their match against Australia at Suncorp Stadium. Fearing a similar attendance for the series final, the tournament organisers relocated the match to Ericsson Stadium.

With the Rugby League World Cup to be staged the following year, and tours of Great Britain by Australia in 2001 and 2003 and New Zealand in 2002, the Tri-nations was not held again until 2004.

Venues 
The games were played at the following venues in Australia and New Zealand. The tournament final was played in Auckland.

Results

Tournament matches

Tournament standings

Final

Non-series Test 
During the series, New Zealand also played a Test against Tonga. This was the last test match to be held at Auckland's Carlaw Park.

Non-series Match 
As a curtain raiser to the final, New Zealand Māori played Great Britain.

References 

Tri-Nations
Tri-Nations
Rugby League Tri-Nations
Tri
1999
1999